The Complete Roadrunner Collection (1997–2003) is a box set compilation album by American nu metal band Coal Chamber.

Background
It was made available digitally in the U.S. on March 12, 2013 and was released across Europe both digitally and in CD format on June 3, 2013. The box set includes the band's three studio albums released under Roadrunner Records between 1997 and 2002, as well as the rarities album Giving the Devil His Due.

Track listing

Coal Chamber (1997)

"Maricon Puto" and "I" are merged into one track on the physical release of this compilation. However, on Spotify, the two tracks are separate, as is the case with all other versions of the 1997 self-titled album

Chamber Music (1999)

Dark Days (2002)

Giving the Devil His Due (2003)

References

Coal Chamber albums
Roadrunner Records compilation albums
2013 compilation albums